Eastern Air Pty Ltd, operating as Eastern Air Services, is an Australian airline headquartered in Port Macquarie. The airline operates solely in New South Wales and Queensland with regularly scheduled flights using its fleet of regional turboprop aircraft.

Destinations 
Eastern Air Services serves the following destinations:
New South Wales
Lord Howe Island – Lord Howe Island Airport
Newcastle – Williamtown Airport
Port Macquarie – Port Macquarie Airport
Queensland
Gold Coast – Gold Coast Airport

Fleet 
As of 1 February 2022, the Eastern Air Services fleet consists of the following aircraft:

References 

Airlines of Australia